CICT may refer to:

College of information and communication technology known as CICT
 Taguig City University, Philippines
 Holy Angel University, Angeles City, Pampanga, Philippines
 Camarines Sur Polytechnic Colleges, Nabua, Camarines Sur, Philippines

Other uses
 Central Institute of Classical Tamil, Chennai, India
 CICT-DT, the Global Television Network's owned-and-operated television station in Calgary, Canada
 Commission on Information and Communications Technology (Philippines)